Drosophila buzzatii is a species of fruit fly in the genus Drosophila, described by Patterson and Wheeler in 1942. It is named for geneticist Adriano Buzzati-Traverso.

References

buzzatii